Dr. Muhammad Najeeb Naqi Khanis a Kashmiri legislator and the current Minister for Finance, Health & P&D of Pakistan administered Azad Jammu & Kashmir. Najeeb Naqi Khan took the oath for the Office of Minister of Azad Jammu & Kashmir on 7 August 2016. He belongs to the Pakistan Muslim League Nawaz.

Personal
Dr Najeeb Naqi Khan belongs to a well-known political family and inherited the political career from his father Col Muhammad Naqi Khan (Late) who led the Kashmir Legislative Assembly in 1980-1985 as former Minister for Health & Food. His Grand Father Baba-e-Poonch Khansahb Col. Khan Muhammad Khan, remained member of the Jammu & Kashmir Assembly from 1934 to 1946. He was also Chairman War Council of Azad Jammu & Kashmir in 1947 and then member Defence Council. He founded Sudhan Educational Conference in 1934.

Early life and education
Dr Najeeb Naqi Khan born on 19 January 1964 in Rawalpindi. He spent early years of his life in Dhar Dhrach, (Numb) Pallandri. He received his school education from Aitchison College, Lahore (1970-1982), one of the most renowned & historic educational institutions in Pakistan. He studied medical sciences in King Edward Medical University (1983-1988), Lahore and completed his MBBS degree in 1988.

Political career
Dr. Najeeb Naqi is one of the most popular and successful politicians of AJ&K as evident from the fact that he has been elected as the member of AJ&K Legislative Assembly for four consecutive terms from his native constituency of Pallandari.
He started off his political career in early 1990’s with the turn of events following the unfortunate death of his father Col. Muhammad Naqi Khan in a car accident just before a day to election. While being a prominent figure of the AJK politics he has always remained at the forefront for the rights of his people. Winning district status for Sudhanoti in 1995 with strong support from Sardar Mohammad Abdul Qayyum Khan, is one of his remarkable achievements that led to a new era of progress and development in the area. 
As a visionary leader Dr. Najeeb Naqi continues his endeavors for the development of his constituency. District Hospital Sudhanoti is one of such projects that is about to complete soon while a number of other projects for the development of area are in different phases of planning and implementation.

Political Career at a Glance
 Member, Azad Jammu & Kashmir Legislative Assembly - (1991-1996); served as Parliamentary Secretary & P&D, Health in the Muslim Conference led government by Sardar Mohammad Abdul Qayyum Khan.
 Member, Azad Jammu & Kashmir Legislative Assembly - (1996-2001) – a leading Opposition member during the PPP government and Member of Public Accounts Committee led government by Barrister Sultan Mehmood Chaudhry
 Member, Kashmir Council – (2001–2006) Chairman Kashmir Council Pervez Musharraf
 Member, Azad Jammu & Kashmir Legislative Assembly – (2006–2011); served as Minister for Health & Education (Colleges & Universities) & IT in Muslim Conference government led by Sardar Attique Ahmed Khan
 Member, Azad Jammu & Kashmir Legislative Assembly – (2011–2016) – Opposition Member during the PPP government and Member Public Accounts Committee led government by Chaudhry Abdul Majid
 Sitting Member, Azad Jammu & Kashmir Legislative Assembly – (2016 to present); Minister for Finance, Health and Planning & Development

References

External links
 Members AJK Legislative Assembly
 www.dawn.com
 www.sdgpakistan.pk
 pid.gov.pk

People from Azad Kashmir
Pakistan Muslim League (N) politicians
Pakistani politicians
Members of the Legislative Assembly of Azad Jammu and Kashmir
1964 births
Living people